Neeragattu Anusha (born 12 August 1999) is an Andhraite cricketer. She plays for Andhra Pradesh and South Zone. She has played 4 First-class, 15 List A and 14 Women's Twenty20 matches. She made her debut in major domestic cricket on 11 December 2013 in a one-day match against Baroda.

References

External links
 Cricinfo

Andhra women cricketers
South Zone women cricketers
1999 births
Living people